Matúš Lacko (born 12 April 1987) is a Slovak football midfielder who plays for the Czech National Football League club FC Vysočina Jihlava.

References

External links
1. SC Znojmo profile

1987 births
Living people
Slovak footballers
Association football midfielders
ŠK Slovan Bratislava players
FC Zbrojovka Brno players
1. SC Znojmo players
Czech First League players
Expatriate footballers in the Czech Republic
Footballers from Bratislava
FC Vysočina Jihlava players
Slovak expatriate sportspeople in the Czech Republic
Czech National Football League players